Most islands on the Aegean Sea can be reached by ferry from the port of Piraeus in Athens. The services in the list are subject to changes in routing as well as the ferries operated.

Destinations

Saronic Gulf

Crete, Kythera and Antikythera

Cyclades

Greece transport-related lists
21st century-related lists
Water transport-related lists
Incomplete transport lists
Athens-related lists
Lists of ferry routes
Ferry